Pietro Vitalini (born 29 June 1967) is an Italian former alpine skier who competed in the 1994 Winter Olympics. Vitalini finished on the podium in FIS World Cup events five times in his career.

Biography
Together with Kristian Ghedina, Peter Runggaldier, Werner Perathoner and Alessandro Fattori, he helped to bring out Italian Alpine skiing, traditionally more competitive in technical specialties, even in downhill and super-giant races. The Italian speed team, nicknamed Italjet, succeeded in the nineties in expressing itself at the high levels of the well-known Austrian and Swiss national teams.

See also
Italy national alpine ski team

References

External links
 

1967 births
Living people
Italian male alpine skiers
Olympic alpine skiers of Italy
Alpine skiers at the 1994 Winter Olympics